Lingaa is a 2014 Indian Tamil-language action drama film written and directed by K. S. Ravikumar, based on a story by Pon Kumaran, and produced by Rockline Venkatesh under Rockline Entertainments. It stars Rajinikanth, Anushka Shetty, Sonakshi Sinha and Jagapathi Babu, while Santhanam and Karunakaran essay supporting roles. The soundtrack was composed by A. R. Rahman. The cinematography and editing was handled by R. Rathnavelu and Samjith Mohammed respectively. The film revolves around Lingaa, a thief who enters a village called Solaiyur to save the dam and temple built by his grandfather.

Lingaa marks the reunion of Rajinikanth's collaboration with Ravikumar, after 15
years, since Padayappa (1999). The film's principal photography commenced on 1 May 2014, at Mysore. The majority of the filming took place in Ramoji Film City and Annapurna Studios, and few scenes in Chennai; the film's flashback portions was shot in various locations in Karnataka, and the climax portions were filmed in Linganamakki Dam and Jog Falls in Shimoga, the film's shooting was completed within six months.

Made on a budget of 100 crore, the film was released on 12 December 2014, coinciding with Rajinikanth's birthday. The film was dubbed and released in Telugu and Hindi languages with the same name. The film received mixed reviews, praise for Rajinikanth and Anushka's performance and A. R. Rahman music, but criticised the screenplay, the climax and the length.

Plot 

The Solaiyur Dam, which is the lifeline of the village Solaiyur, is under assessment for structural integrity. The dam inspector is ordered to report that the dam is unfit to remain, by the corrupt local MP Nagabhushan, who wants the dam demolished for his benefit. When the former refuses, Nagabhushan stabs him to death. The dying man throws a pen drive (disguised as a rudraksha) containing the details certifying the dam's integrity, into an abandoned Shiva temple near the dam and warns the village head Karunakaran, who arrives upon hearing his cries, that the temple has to be opened as soon as possible, before dying. Karunakaran firmly believes that the temple can only be opened by the descendant of Raja Lingeshwaran, an erstwhile king who built the dam as well as the temple. Lakshmi, the granddaughter of Karunakaran and a journalist, embarks on a search to find the descendant. She soon discovers the person - Lingeswaran aka Lingaa. Lingaa, the grandson of Raja Lingeshwaran, is a witty thief, living in poverty. He bears a grudge against his grandfather, firmly believing his "squandering nature" as the root cause of his poverty. Consequently, he refuses to accompany Lakshmi to Solaiyur.

Undeterred, Lakshmi follows Lingaa and records his gang's act of stealing a priceless necklace and implicates them, thus forcing him to accompany her to Solaiyur. At Solaiyur, Lingaa receives a warm welcome from the villagers. Later, Karunakaran privately tells Lingaa that the Lingam installed at the Shiva temple is made of Emerald stone, an extremely valuable artifact. At midnight, he infiltrates the Shiva temple to steal the Lingam. Unfortunately, he is noticed by one of the dam's security guards, who immediately alert the villagers. Aware of their presence, Lingaa quickly and wittingly changes his act to an appearance of performing a pooja, thus fooling the villagers.  A relieved Karunakaran then narrates the true story of Lingaa's heritage.

Raja Lingeshwaran, the ruler of the erstwhile princely state of Kodiyur, is shown to be a civil services officer and the collector of Madurai district. Upon surveying the village of Solaiyur, he receives complaints from the local villagers, stating that they have no water for nine months per year while facing raging floods for the other three months - which has led to recurring and devastating famines. Determined to help, he petitions to construct a dam, for the benefit of Solaiyur. However, his plan is rejected at the annual collectors' meeting and he is instead forced to approve another infrastructure project. He refuses to do so and is blackmailed of being dismissed for his non-compliance. In defiance, Lingeshwaran resigns from his position.

Later, several members of the Indian royalty and British officers congregate to celebrate Lingeshwaran's birthday. Among them is Collector Lawrence Hunter, the officer who had opposed Raja Lingeshwaran's plan. He is shocked to discover Lingeshwaran's real identity. Over dinner, Lingeshwaran notifies the British Governor of his resignation and expresses his wish to construct a dam at Solaiyur, with his capital. He requests approval from the British Government, which is granted. The Collector challenges Raja Lingeshwaran that he will never finish building the dam. Though Lingeshwaran faces multiple difficulties and a near stoppage of work due to caste issues (which were ignited by Sambandam, a resident shown to be working as a spy), the dam is constructed with the help of the villagers, who turn out to be very co-operative with Lingeshwaran. Bharathi, the daughter of a senior villager falls in love with Raja Lingeshwaran. Finally, the dam is almost complete, except for the shaft doors. The doors are found to be held in the collector's possession. With the floods soon to occur, Lingeshwaran negotiates with the collector and tries to persuade him to give in. As a dirty trick, the latter proposes that if the shaft doors are to be handed over, Lingeshwaran must hand over the villagers' land as a bribe and the credit for constructing the dam, to which he reluctantly agrees. Sambandam discreetly brings the villagers to the collector's residence at the same time and tricks them into believing that Lingeshwaran is a puppet of the British, thus manipulating them.

After the dam's completion, the infuriated villagers reprimand Lingeshwaran for his "malicious actions" and banishes him from Solaiyur, despite Bharati's protests. Fully knowing the double-play behind him, Lingeshwaran leaves and is later accompanied by Bharati. The collector's wife, Jenny, disgusted at her husband's behavior, angrily reveals to the villagers that they have been double-crossed and reveals the real terms that Lingeshwaran had agreed to. The villagers, upon realizing their double play, pursue Sambandam, who commits suicide out of guilt. Jenny decides to leave with her daughter but is stopped by her husband, having realized his folly. Upon her insistence, he publicly declares that the dam was constructed by  Lingeshwaran. After a long search, the villagers find him and Bharathi, now his wife, living in poverty. After unsuccessfully trying to convince him to return to Solaiyur, the villagers resolve to keep the Shiva temple (which he had built), closed until the Raja or his descendants return to the village. Lingaa, on hearing his grandfather's story, changes his opinion about his grandfather and decides to mend his ways.

In the present, Karunakaran reveals that his invitation to Lingaa was merely a ruse, as he believes that danger is afoot; recalling the fate of the dam inspector. At a function, Nagabhushan reveals to an accomplice that he plans to drill small holes into the dam, which would be filled with explosives; when triggered, would destroy the dam. Lakshmi secretly records Nagabhushan's conversation with the help of a spy camera and plays it before the entire town, exposing Nagabhushan. Lingaa then reveals that he had already discovered the pen drive and had the dam's certificate approved, copied, and spread throughout the Internet; ultimately culminating in Nagabhushan being ousted from his position. Enraged, he kidnaps Lakshmi and escapes in a hot air balloon. Having a bomb with him, he plans to detonate it over the dam, to spite Lingaa. Lingaa pursues him on a bike and drives it over a ledge at the exact time Nagabhushan's balloon appears on it, landing on top of it; he manages to climb into the carriage. After an ensuing fight, he kicks Nagabhushan out, who plunges to his death in the water below and kicks the bomb into the reservoir, which explodes moments later, thus saving the dam. With his work done, Lingaa plans to leave. However, the police finally catch up to him, demanding that he testify for an inquiry (about his recent jewel heist). Just before leaving, they are joined by Lakshmi, having fallen in love with Lingaa.

Cast 

 Rajinikanth in dual role as:
 K. Lingeswaran a.k.a. Lingaa, a thief (grandson of Raja Lingeswaran)
 Raja Lingeswaran ICS, civil engineer, district collector of Madurai (1939) and the namely King of Kodaiyur (grandfather of Lingaa)
 Anushka Shetty as Lakshmi (voiceover by Renuka Kathir)
 Sonakshi Sinha as Bharathi (voiceover by Chinmayi)
 Jagapati Babu as M.P. Nagabooshan
 K. Viswanath as Karunakara
 Santhanam as Lingaa's sidekick
 Karunakaran as Kothandam, Lingala’s sidekick
 Brahmanandam as Inspector Raja Varman 
 Dev Gill as a freedom fighter
 Radha Ravi as Kavi Bharathi
 Vijayakumar as Karunakara's father, a village head
 Nizhalgal Ravi as Zamindar of Rayakottai
 R. Sundarrajan as Sambandham, the collector's spy
 Manobala as train loco pilot in 1939
 Ilavarasu as Sami Pillai, Raja Lingeswaran's right-hand
 Ponvannan as the government official officer
 Jayaprakash as a corrupt government officer
 Madhan Bob as the merchant
 Crane Manohar as the merchant's security guard
 Anu Mohan as Shanmugam
 Vasu Vikram as Nagabooshan's assistant
 William Orendorff as British Governor 
 Ravi Mariya as the 5-star hotel manager
 Rajkamal as the 5-star hotel security camera operator
 C. Ranganathan as the 5-star hotel chief security guard
 Kamalesh Kumar as Poet
 Suchithra as Vasantha
 Scissor Manohar as a Police constable
 Padayappa Ramesh as the 5-star hotel security guard
 Erode Soundar as a villager
 S. V. S. Kumar as a villager
 Thaadi Balaji as Lingaa's friend
 Falk Neumann as Collector Lawrence Hunter
 Lauren J. Irwin as a British collector's wife
 Rajitha as a 5-star hotel guest 
 Amritha Aiyer as a villager 
 K.S. Ravikumar as Assistant Commissioner "Finishing" Kumar (cameo appearance)
 R. Rathnavelu as himself (cameo appearance in the song "Oh Nanba")
 Rockline Venkatesh as himself (cameo appearance in the song "Oh Nanba")

Production

Development 
The script as well as screenplay for Lingaa were penned by Pon Kumaran, who had registered the story with the South Indian Film Writers' Association under the title King Khan in 2010. The story is loosely based on John Penniquick who built Mullaperiyar Dam. He had also penned the dialogues for the film. The pre-production works began in March 2014.  The following month, Ravikumar stated on Facebook that filming would commence soon and that the film was titled Lingaa. Eros International was confirmed to distribute the film worldwide. Rockline Venkatesh was announced as producer. A. R. Rahman was roped in as the music composer for the film and R. Rathnavelu as the cinematographer. Sabu Cyril was confirmed to handle the art direction for the film. Samjith Mhd, who had worked with Ravikumar earlier in Policegiri (2013), was confirmed as the film's editor. Hollywood stuntman Lee Whittaker was recruited to frame the stunt sequences. During the audio launch of the film's soundtrack album, Ravikumar said the title Lingaa was suggested to him by Rajinikanth. Director Ameer earlier had the rights to the title for his next project but handed over the rights to Ravikumar for Rajinikanth.

Casting 
In April 2014, Shriya Saran and Samantha Ruth Prabhu were selected to play the role of Lakshmi and Bharathi. But later both of them were replaced due to date issues. Then Sonakshi Sinha confirmed her involvement in the project for the role of Bharati and Hansika Motwani was signed for the role of Lakshmi. Then Hansika Motwani came out of the project due to her Telugu projects. In late April 2014, Telugu actor Jagapati Babu confirmed on his Yahoo messenger and his Yahoo mail that he was signed on for a role in the film. Sudeep was reported to have refused an important role in the film, but he however denied being approached for the film in the first place. Further, reports circulated again in August 2014 which strongly suggested Sudeep was a part of the cast as he was seen during the canning of the climax portions but he clarified that he wasn't offered a role in the film yet. Comedian Santhanam joined the team in May 2014. Actors Radha Ravi, Vijayakumar and R. Sundarrajan were called up to play important roles in the film.

British actress Lauren J. Irwin was selected to appear in the pre-independence portions of the film. American actor, director and writer William Orendorff was selected to play a key role in the film and furthermore, confirming his involvement in the project through Twitter. Anushka Shetty was roped as another heroine and she joined the unit on 27 June 2014 (last schedule). Sonakshi Sinha, in an interview with Mumbai Mirror, said that there are two different tracks of filming scenes, and that Anushka Shetty and her will not share much screen space and was given liberty to pick up the role she felt suitable for her. In June 2014, actor Karunakaran was selected to play a supporting role. Actor Dev Gill was selected to play a secondary antagonist role. Director and comedian Manobala confirmed that he would appear in a small yet significant role as a train driver. Comedian Brahmanandam was selected to portray the role of a police officer. Actresses Trisha Krishnan and Nayanthara were rumored to perform an item number, but the latter's inclusion remained unconfirmed and the former denied the news saying that she was never approached.

Filming 

Principal photography commenced on 1 May 2014 in Mysuru, Karnataka, India, with a customary Puja ceremony. Rajinikanth and Sonakshi Sinha took part in the shoot. The muhurat shot of the movie was filmed in May 2014 at the Chamundeshwari Temple in Mysuru. Cinematographer R. Rathnavelu revealed that filming would be done using a Red Dragon 6K camera. In addition to this, the Phantom Flex 4K camera was used for filming action sequences. The film crew shot in various locations in Karnataka like Melukote, Manuvana, Pandavapura, Chamundi Hills and inside the residential portion of Mysore Palace. On 10 May 2014, Sonakshi had completed her portions for the first schedule of the film's shooting. On 18 May 2014, Rajinikanth and Sonakshi Sinha shot some scenes dating back to the British era in front of the illuminated residential portion of the palace. Horses were used for the shot. Over 50 policemen and 30 bouncers had been deployed to prevent people from getting near the shooting area in Mysore.

The team then moved to Ramoji Film City, Hyderabad for a two-month schedule, where sequences featuring the entire cast were shot for 50 days. A song sequence featuring Rajinikanth and Anushka was shot at Annapurna Studios, wherein the production team had designed a huge set for the song. On 13 July 2014, actress Sonakshi Sinha completed her filming schedule in Hyderabad. The Hyderabad schedule ended on 30 July 2014. During the Hyderabad schedule of the film, news circulated that Rajinikanth fainted on the sets while filming a heavy action sequence but Ravikumar denied this, citing that the actor was healthy.

In early August 2014, the team shot some scenes near the Radisson Hotel in Chennai, with Anushka Shetty in the frame. In mid-August 2014, the production unit confirmed that 80% of the filming was completed. Filming then moved to Thirthahalli and the Jog Falls, where some important scenes were canned for twenty-five days. For the film's climax, a big statue of Lord Shiva and dam both as set were constructed next to the Jog water-falls. Shooting also took place at the Linganamakki Dam. In September 2014, the climax portion's filming was allotted ten days, confirming the shoot in Karnataka. On 22 September 2014, Whittaker confirmed that the climax portions of the film were completed with a stunt sequence choreographed by him. The film's shooting was wrapped up by 23 September 2014 except filming of two song sequences that were reported to be canned in Chennai and Scotland. Ravikumar stated that the climax scene, which involved a hot air balloon, was inspired by a sequence Armour of God (1986).

During the Hyderabad schedule of the film, some villagers of Anajpur village in Rangareddy district in Telangana had tried to halt the shooting of Lingaa, stating that some chemicals were mixed in the nearby lake during shoots, polluting local water. But the crew members stated that they had sought the permission of the irrigation department and the village Panchayat for shooting. The crew members also dismissed allegations of chemicals in the lake. During the shooting of the climax portions near the Linganamakki Dam, environmental organisations opposed the permission granted to the production unit for shooting, suggesting a threat to the location as public entry to the dam was prohibited. The organisations also had sent a petition to both the Deputy Collector's office and the Deputy Commissioner's office, who in turn, sent the petition to the Chief Minister of Karnataka, Siddaramaiah, for scrutinity. Regarding the same issue, officials of the Karnataka State Police Board also sent a letter to the Chief Minister asking him to end the shooting of the portions of the film there, citing that the bio-diversity and life in and around the dam would be affected. The elephants featured in the film were constructed through CGI, and a disclaimer was issued for this at the beginning of the film.

Themes and influences 
Some critics drew similarities to the film, along with Vijay's Kaththi (2014), on the basis of the characterisation of the lead protagonist, to the themes and script transitions, as well as the message involved in the film, was listed in an article by Behindwoods.

Music 

The soundtrack album consisting of five songs, were composed by A. R. Rahman. The album of the original version was released on 5 November 2014, at a promotional event held at Chennai, with Rajinikanth, K. S. Ravikumar and the cast and crew attending the event, except Rahman where he spoke in a video about the making of the film. The Telugu version was released on 8 November 2014, at a curtain raiser, event held at Hyderabad, where Chiranjeevi and K. Viswanath attended as the chief guest. The Hindi version was released on 26 November 2014.

Marketing 
The motion poster of the film was released on Ganesh Chaturthi, on 29 August 2014. The first poster featured Rajinikanth walking with a temple being shown in the poster's backdrop. The official teaser was released on 22 October 2014, coinciding with Diwali. The trailer was released on 5 November 2014 at the audio launch of the film. A 40-second song teaser of "Mona Gasolina" featuring Rajinikanth and Anushka Shetty was released on 7 November 2014. Another 40-second song teaser1 was released on 8 November 2014 of the song "En Mannavva" featuring Rajinikanth and Sonakshi Sinha.

While the original duration of the film lasts about 175 minutes, the makers trimmed the original version from 166 minutes, and the Hindi version was reduced to 148 minutes, due to mixed reviews. The makers unveiled few deleted scenes from the film post-release.

Release

Theatrical
The film was cleared by the Central Board of Film Certification on 24 November 2014. Lingaa was released worldwide on 12 December 2014, which coincided with Rajinikanth's birthday, and it is the first time in Rajinikanth's career, to have his film released on his birthday. The reservations for the film kickstarted on 10 December 2014. The film was released on an estimated 5500 screens.

Home media 

Reception

Box office 
Lingaa had the largest opening day for a Tamil film as it earned  nett in India and grossed  worldwide. The film also set records on its opening weekend; it earned  nett in India and grossed  worldwide. After its second weekend, the film's domestic total reached  nett.

Critical response 

M Suganth of The Times of India gave 2.5 out of 5 and wrote, "The scale of the production, some of Santhanam's one-liners and the charisma of Rajinikanth somewhat make it bearable but they aren't enough." Behindwoods rated the film 2.5 out of 5 and stated, "Rajinikanth's mesmerizing energy let down by writing. But give it your time for Superstar's non-diminishing charisma." Rediff rated 3 out of 5 and felt that "Lingaa is buffoonery at its most old-school". Sify called Lingaa "a mixed bag. The star charisma of Rajinikanth is intact but the film is long with a weak storyline that flounders with a long drawn out climax." The Hindustan Times said "Lingaa offers nothing new despite being one of Rajinikanth's better works in the recent past." Oneindia.in rated it 3 out of 5, calling it a "Typical Rajinikanth movie" and stating "KS Ravikumar's story telling skills induces a fresh dimension to the movie. CNN-IBN also rated it 3 out of 5, commenting "Because two Rajinikanths are always better than one".

Lawsuit

Script infringement issue 
On 2 November 2014, the Madurai Bench of Madras High Court bench's Justice M. Venugopal ordered a notice to producer 'Rockline' Venkatesh, script writer Pon Kumaran and director K.S. Ravikumar on account of accusations by the film maker K.R. Ravi Rathinam of the Tamil Nadu Housing Board colony who claimed that script of Lingaa was actually the one he had written for directing a film titled Mullai Vanam 999 based on the construction of the Mullaperiyar dam by John Pennycuick. Further, actor Rajinikanth who wasn't involved in the film script larceny was issued notice as he had distribution rights for the film. However, Justice M. Venugopal refused to pass any interim orders to hold audio release that is scheduled on 5 November 2014.
On 3 December 2014, the court dismissed a writ petition filed by Ravi Rathinam. Justice Venugopal claimed the dispute to be private and it could have been solved only by initiating civil or criminal proceedings and not by invoking the writ jurisdiction of the High Court.

Distributors' losses 

The distributors of Tamil Nadu suffered large losses and asked for their money back. A distributor under the banner Marina stated that it suffered losses in Trichy and Thanjavur areas and submitted a petition to go on a hunger strike. Vijayabhargavi Entertainers stated that they suffered losses in Chengalpet region. Capricorn Pictures incurred losses in North Arcot and South Arcot (Cuddalore-Villupuram) circles. Sukra Films and Chandrakala Movies lost money in Coimbatore and Tirunelveli-Tuticorin respectively. The distributors claimed that after 25 days of its release, Lingaa recovered only 30 percent of the down payment. Some theatre owners received settlements for their losses. Rajinikanth later refunded one-third of the  loss reportedly incurred by distributors and exhibitors. He decided to pay them  'on a humanitarian basis', who demanded a full refund and had threatened a 'begging protest' in front of the actor's residence.

References

External links 

2010s Tamil-language films
Indian historical drama films
Films shot in Karnataka
Films shot in Telangana
Films directed by K. S. Ravikumar
2014 films
2010s masala films
Films scored by A. R. Rahman
Indian action drama films
Rockline Entertainments films
Films shot in Mysore
Films involved in plagiarism controversies
2014 action drama films
2010s historical drama films